Jonathan Pim (1806 –  6 July 1885) was an Irish Liberal Party politician. He was elected as Member of Parliament (MP) for Dublin City at the 1865 general election, and held the seat until the 1874 general election, when his absence abroad when the election was called unexpectedly made it impossible to mount an effective campaign. He was president of the Statistical and Social Inquiry Society of Ireland between 1875 and 1877. A Quaker, he served as secretary for the Quaker Relief fund during the Great Irish Famine: the work involved was so exhausting that he suffered a temporary collapse of health. Nonetheless, he retained a lifelong interest in efforts to alleviate the poverty-stricken condition of the Irish. Under his guidance, the family firm, Pim Brothers, opened a pioneering department store in South Great  George's Street in Dublin city centre. He had a reputation for being an especially generous employer. He is buried in the Friends Burial Ground, Dublin in Blackrock, Co. Dublin.

Family
Pim's father was Thomas Anthony Pim, one of the Pim Brothers of Dublin, born in 1771.

Pim married Susanna Todhunter. They had a total of 10 children, of whom 6 would live to adulthood. Pim's daughter Mary was the wife of pioneering lighthouse engineer John Richardson Wigham.

Pim had several notable descendants. His grandson Jonathan Ernest Pim was a lawyer who would hold a number of government positions including Attorney-General for Ireland and briefly Lord Justice of Ireland. His great-grandchildren included Sir Richard Pim, a British naval officer based at Downing Street during World War II, and Charles Bewley, an Irish diplomat and Republican.

Bibliography

References

Sources

External links 

1806 births
1885 deaths
Irish Liberal Party MPs
Members of the Parliament of the United Kingdom for County Dublin constituencies (1801–1922)
UK MPs 1865–1868
UK MPs 1868–1874
Statistical and Social Inquiry Society of Ireland
Irish Quakers
Burials at Friends Burial Ground, Dublin